Sri Subamanya Ghati is in Doddaballapura Taluk in Bangalore Rural District of Karnataka State, India. It belongs to Bangalore Division.

Government Office 

 S.S.Ghati Post Office(561203)
 S.S.Ghati VA Circle(Revenue Department Karnataka)
 S.S.Ghati Primary Health Center
 S.S.Ghati Police Station 
 Telephone Exchange office
 Grama Panchayat Office 
 S.S.Ghati Grama Panchayat Library
 Government Higher Primary School
 Anganwadi Kendra
 S.S.Ghati Grama Panchayat Loka Shikhana Samiti (Citizen literacy center)

Banks 

 Indian Overseas Bank
 Canara Bank
 S.S.Ghati Vyavasaya Seva Sahakara Sanga (Primary Agricultural Credit Society)

External links
 http://web8.kar.nic.in:8080/blakshmi/bank_det_supwise.jsp
 http://www.iob.in/BranchDisplay.aspx?BranchId=120205

Doddaballapura Taluk

Cities and towns in Bangalore Rural district